Charles Randall may refer to:

Charles Randall (footballer) (1884–1916), English footballer
Charles A. Randall (b.1871), American architect practicing in Indiana, South Dakota, and Wyoming
Charles Hiram Randall (1865–1951), Californian politician
Charles S. Randall (1824–1904), member of the United States House of Representatives from Massachusetts